Web Techniques was a monthly magazine published in the United States by CMP Technology. It covered topics aimed at web developers. It ran from February 1996 until its last issue in February 2002, after which it changed formats and titles, becoming New Architect.

Columns
 Programming with Perl, by Randal L. Schwartz
 At Your Server, by Jim Jagielski
 Java@Work, by Al Williams

Awards
 Maggie Award, Best Signed Editorial in a trade publication, 2001

References

Monthly magazines published in the United States
Defunct computer magazines published in the United States
Magazines established in 1996
Magazines disestablished in 2002
Magazines published in San Francisco